Doctors Creek is a stream in the U.S. state of Georgia. It is a tributary to the Altamaha River.

Doctors Creek most likely was named after a Native American chieftain.

References

Rivers of Georgia (U.S. state)
Rivers of Long County, Georgia